Citilinc is the public transport bus service provided by Nashik Mahanagar Parivahan Mahamandal Ltd (SPV of Nashik Municipal Corporation) for the city of Nashik, in Maharashtra. It operates 63 routes around Nashik and its suburban areas with the use of a fleet of nearly 250 buses. Presently, the routes cover a radius of 20km in and around the Nashik area.

History 
In 2020, the Nashik Municipal Corporation submitted a feasibility report to the Government of Maharashtra, for the privatisation of bus services in Nashik, as existing services being operated by the state-run Maharashtra State Road Transport Corporation (MSRTC) were found to be loss-making and insufficient for the needs of the city.

References

Bus transport in India
Nashik
Maharashtra
Municipal transport agencies of India
Government agencies established in 2021
Indian companies established in 2021
Transport companies established in 2021